Battling Bunyan is a 1924 American silent sports comedy film directed by Paul Hurst and starring Wesley Barry, Frank Campeau, and Molly Malone. In order to raise cash in a hurry, a young man takes up professional boxing despite the fact he is totally unsuited to it.

Plot

As described in a review in a film magazine, Bunyan (Barry), a young chap who has gained a lot of experience in the school of hard knocks, has a small position in a garage. The light-weight champion fighter (Ralesco) comes in and flirts with Bunyan’s girl Molly (Malone) and Bunyan tries to fight him. Jim Canby (Campeau), the local fight promoter, gets the idea of signing Bunyan up for fights to give his patrons a laugh, billing him as Red Aiken Bunyan, and it works. Bunyan knows he is a clown but the money helps to buy a partnership in the garage. Finally, the champion returns and again starts after Molly. The prize fight is to be a frame-up and Bunyan agrees at $200 a round. He takes a terrific beating and tries to stay out five rounds but only lasts four. Mollie, thoroughly won over by his gameness, tries to see Bunyan, but the champion intercepts her and tries to attack her when she repulses him. Bunyan jumps on him and finally beats him. Canby gives Bunyan the full thousand dollars prize and he buys into the garage partnership and then marries Molly.

Cast

Reception
While Battling Bunyan was acceptable in the United States, the British Board of Film Censors banned the film when it was submitted for review in 1926.

Preservation
Battling Bunyan has been released on dvd.

References

Bibliography
 Tim Lussier. "Bare Knees" Flapper: The Life and Films of Virginia Lee Corbin. McFarland, 2018.

External links

Movie exhibit card with Barry, Metropolitan Museum of Art

1924 films
American sports comedy films
Films directed by Paul Hurst
American silent feature films
Pathé Exchange films
American black-and-white films
1920s sports comedy films
American boxing films
1924 comedy films
1920s English-language films
1920s American films
Silent American comedy films
Silent sports comedy films